Wallace's dasyure (Myoictis wallacei) or Wallace's three-striped dasyure is a member of the order Dasyuromorphia. This marsupial carnivore is found in Indonesia and Papua New Guinea.  Specifically, it is found on the Aru Islands of the Maluku Province of Indonesia.

The scientific name of this animal comes from British naturalist, Alfred Russel Wallace, who collected a specimen in the Aru Islands.

References 

Globaltwicher.com

Dasyuromorphs
Mammals of Indonesia
Mammals of Papua New Guinea
Mammals described in 1858
Marsupials of New Guinea